The first election to the City and County of Swansea Council was held on 4 May 1995.  It was followed by the 1999 election.  On the same day there were elections to  the other 21 local authorities in Wales and community councils in Wales.

Overview
All council seats were up for election. These were the first elections held following local government reorganisation and the abolition of West Glamorgan County Council. The ward boundaries for the new authority were based on the previous Lliw Valley Borough Council and Swansea City Council although the number of members elected for individual wards was reduced. Conservative candidates were heavily defeated.

|}

Candidates
Most sitting members of West Glamorgan County council sought election to the new authority. A number were also members of the previous district councils but others contested a ward against a sitting district councillor.

Results

Bishopston (one seat)

Bonymaen (two seats)

Castle (three seats)

Clydach (one seat)

Cockett (four seats)

Cwmbwrla (two seats)

Dulais East (one seat)

Dunvant (one seat)

Fairwood (one seat)

Gorseinon Central (one seat)

Gorseinon East (one seat)

Gower (one seat)

Gowerton East (one seat)

Gowerton West (one seat)

Killay North (one seat)

Killay South (one seat)

Kingsbridge (two seats)

Landore (two seats)

Llangyfelach (two seats)

Llansamlet (three seats)

Lower Loughor (one seat)

Mawr (one seat)

|- style="background:#f6f6f6;"
! style="background:white;"| 
| colspan="5" | Plaid dros Gymru win (new seat)
|-

Mayals (one seat)

Morriston (four seats)

Mynyddbach (three seats)

Newton (one seat)

Oystermouth (one seat)

Penclawdd (one seat)

Penderry (four seats)

Penllergaer (one seat)

Pennard (one seat)

Penyrheol (two seats)

Pontarddulais (one seat)

Sketty (four seats)

St Thomas (two seats)

Talybont (one seat)

Townhill (two seats)

Uplands (four seats)

Upper Loughor (two seats)

Vardre (one seat)

West Cross (two seats)

References

1995
1995 Welsh local elections
20th century in Swansea